Dayo Olopade is a Nigerian-American writer and lawyer and the author of The Bright Continent: Breaking Rules and Making Change in Modern Africa.

Life 
She was born and raised in Chicago to academic parents. She attended the University of Chicago Laboratory Schools and St. Paul's School before going to Yale College. She earned graduate degrees from Yale School of Management and Yale Law School, where she was a Knight Law and Media Scholar at the Yale Information Society Project, and a Yale World Fellow.

In 2009, she was named as a Bernard Schwartz Fellow at the New America Foundation. She has written essays, reviews and articles for publications like The Atlantic, The American Prospect, The Guardian, Foreign Policy, The New Republic, The New York Times, and The Washington Post.

In 2014, she published The Bright Continent, a book about African development and technology. She has written that "institutional failures accelerate the process of experimentation and problem solving." 
She has been a critic of governments across Africa, and former Liberian President Ellen Johnson-Sirleaf.

She was advisor to Andela, Safara, and Cancer IQ.

Family 
Her mother, Olufunmilayo Falusi Olopade, is a cancer researcher at the University of Chicago and recipient of the 2005 "Genius Grant" from the John D. and Catherine T. MacArthur Foundation, where she is also on the board. In 2016, she married Walter Lamberson.

Works 
The bright continent : breaking rules and making change in modern Africa, Boston ; New York : Mariner Books Houghton Mifflin Harcourt, 2014. ,

References

External links 
Dayo Olopade: The new African narrative, TED, July 5, 2012

Living people
Year of birth missing (living people)
American people of Nigerian descent
Writers from Chicago
Yale College alumni
Yale Law School alumni
Yale School of Management alumni